Michael Huey (born 1950) is an American musician.

Michael Huey may also refer to:
 Michael Huey (artist) (born 1964), American artist
 Michael Huey (American football) (born 1988), American football player